Love Is the Answer: 24 Songs of Faith, Hope and Love is the fifty-ninth album by American singer/guitarist Glen Campbell, released in 2004 (see 2004 in music).

Track listing

Disc 1:

 "Shower the People" (James Taylor) – (4:22)
 "People Get Ready" (Curtis Mayfield) – (3:21)
 "Up Where We Belong" (Jack Nitzsche, Wilbur Jennings, Buffy Sainte-Marie) – (4:25)
 "Love Is the Answer" (Todd Rundgren) – (4:25)
 "How Could I Ask For More" (Cindy Morgan) – (3:31)
 "O, How I Love Jesus" (Traditional, arr. by Tim Akers, Bubba Smith, Glen Campbell) – (3:18)
 "Just a Closer Walk with Thee" (Traditional, arr. by Tim Akers, Bubba Smith, Glen Campbell) – (3:40)
 "'Tis So Sweet To Trust in Jesus" (Traditional, arr. by Tim Akers, Bubba Smith, Glen Campbell) – (3:10)
 "He Leadeth Me" (Traditional, arr. by Tim Akers, Bubba Smith, Glen Campbell) – (2:45)
 "What a Friend We Have in Jesus" (Traditional, arr. by Tim Akers, Bubba Smith, Glen Campbell) – (4:12)
 "Pass Me Not, O Gentle Saviour" (Traditional, arr. by Tim Akers, Bubba Smith Glen Campbell) – (3:41)
 "The Old Rugged Cross" (Traditional, arr. by Tim Akers, Bubba Smith, Glen Campbell) – (3:56)
 
Disc 2:
 
 "Mighty Clouds of Joy" (Robert Nix, Buddy Buie) – (3:11)
 "Lean on Me" (Bill Withers) – (3:49)
 "Mary, Did You Know?" (Mark Lowery, Buddy Greene) – (3:22)
 "Try A Little Kindness" (Glen Campbell) – (2:32)
 "I Need Thee Every Hour" (Traditional, arr. by Tim Akers, Bubba Smith, Glen Campbell) – (3:18)
 "Where Could I Go But to the Lord" (J. B. Coats) – (3:33)
 "Rock of Ages" (Traditional, arr. by Tim Akers, Bubba Smith, Glen Campbell) – (3:05)
 "Love Lifted Me" (Traditional, arr. by Tim Akers, Bubba Smith, Glen Campbell) – (3:22)
 "Amazing Grace" (John Newton) – (3:36)
 "I Love to Tell the Story" (Traditional, arr. by Tim Akers, Bubba Smith, Glen Campbell) – (3:15)
 "Blessed Assurance" (Traditional, arr. by Tim Akers, Bubba Smith, Glen Campbell) – (3:17)
 "You'll Never Walk Alone" (Oscar Hammerstein, Richard Rodgers) – (2:47)

Personnel
Glen Campbell – vocals, bagpipes
Tim Akers – piano, keyboards, Hammond B-3 organ
Tom Hemby – acoustic guitar, electric guitar, bouzouki
Paul Leim – drums
Jerry McPherson – electric guitar
Craig Nelson – electric bass and acoustic bass
Lonnie Wilson – drums
Tom Wanca – Hammond B-3 organ, keyboards
Russ Pahl – pedal steel, dobro, banjo, mandolin
Eric Darken – percussion
Brent Mason – electric guitar solos
Background vocals – Lisa Cochran, Perry Coleman, Wes Hightower, Dennis Wilson

Production
Producer – Bubba Smith
Executive Producers – Tony Brown/Tim DuBois/Van Fletcher
Engineer – Steve Marcantonio/Cartee Day Studios, Nashville, TN
Tracking Engineer – Steve Crowder
Mixing Engineer – JC Monterrosa
Glen's lead vocals recorded at The Danger Room, Phoenix, AZ
Assistant Engineer : Cal Campbell
Mastered by Hank Williams at Mastermix Studio, Nashville, TN
Production Coordination – Jamie Kiner
Art Direction – Susan Levy/Karen Cronin
Design – Karen Cronin
Production – Todd Fennell/Laura Melrose
Photography – Jeff Ross

References

Glen Campbell albums
2004 albums
Universal Records albums